RGBE – RGB (Red, Green, Blue) + E, may refer to:
 RGBE filter – RGB + Emerald
 RGBE image format – RGB + Exponent